Bad Timing is a 1980 film directed by Nicolas Roeg. It may also refer to:

Music
 Bad Timing (album), by Jim O'Rourke, and the title song
 Bad Timing and Other Stories, an EP by The Triffids, including the song "Bad Timing"
 A song by Blue Rodeo from their album Five Days in July
 A song by dEUS from their album Pocket Revolution

Other uses
 "Bad Timing" (Farscape), the final episode of the Australian science fiction television series, Farscape
 A novel in the Strontium Dog series by Rebecca Levene
 "Bad Timing" (Adventure Time), an episode of the American animated television series, Adventure Time